Ernest Nestor Roume (12 July 1858 – 16 April 1941) was a French colonial administrator and a governor of French West Africa from 15 March 1902 to 15 December 1907, and governor of French Indochina from 1915-1916.

References

Further reading
Paul E. Lovejoy et A.S. Kanya-Forstner (dir.), Slavery and its abolition in French West Africa : the official reports of G. Poulet, E. Roume, and G. Deherme, University of Wisconsin-Madison, 1994, p. 206  

1858 births
1941 deaths
Governors of French West Africa